Alois Podhajsky (24 February 1898 – 23 May 1973) was the director of the Spanish Riding School in Vienna, Austria as well as an Olympic medal-winner in dressage, riding instructor, and writer. He competed at the 1936 Summer Olympics and the 1948 Summer Olympics.

Career
Podhajsky was born in Mostar, Bosnia and Herzegovina, and was an officer in the Austrian Army, rising to the rank of colonel. In 1939, Podhajsky became chief of the Academy of Classical Horsemanship, better known as the Spanish Riding School of Vienna, Austria. Founded in 1572, the school's main focus was the training of Lipizzan horses in the art of classical dressage. Podhajsky was director of the school throughout World War II and continued in the position until his retirement in 1965. Following his retirement, he continued to teach classical horsemanship, and wrote a number of books on the topic. Podhajsky died following a stroke in 1973, in Vienna, Austria.

Relocation during World War II
During World War II, worried for the safety of the school and the horses due to bombing raids on Vienna, Podhajsky evacuated most of the stallions out of the city to Sankt Martin im Innkreis in Upper Austria. A number of mares from the Piber Federal Stud, the breeding farm that supplied horses for the school, were also evacuated.

Though the horses were in relative safety, there were still harsh challenges; there was little food for human or animals, and starving refugees sometimes attempted to steal the horses, viewing them as a source of meat. As American General George Patton was leading his troops through Austria, he was alerted to the presence of the Lipizzans in Sankt Martin im Mühlkreis. Patton and Podhajsky had each competed in equestrian events at the Olympic Games. The two men renewed their acquaintance, and after Podhajsky orchestrated an impressive performance by the remaining horses and riders of the school in front of Patton (a lifelong horseman) and Undersecretary of War Robert P. Patterson, the Americans agreed to place the stallions under the protection of the United States for the duration of the war.  Podhajsky later wrote about these events, an account which was made into a motion picture Miracle of the White Stallions by Walt Disney studios, with actor Robert Taylor playing Colonel Podhajsky.

Podhajsky alerted Patton to the location of additional Lipizzan bloodstock. Many Lipizzan mares and some stallions had been appropriated by the Germans from the Austrian breeding farm at Piber and sent to Hostau, to a Nazi-run stud farm in  Czechoslovakia (now the Czech Republic). When Hostau fell behind Soviet lines, captured German officers, under interrogation by U.S. Army Captain Ferdinand Sperl, provided details on the Lipizzans' location and asked the Americans to rescue the horses before they fell into Soviet hands, because it was feared they would be slaughtered for horsemeat. Patton issued orders, and on 28 April 1945 Colonel Charles H. Reed, with members of Troops A, C and F of the 2nd Cavalry Regiment, conducted a raid behind Soviet lines, accepted the surrender of the Germans at Hostau, and evacuated the horses. The Lipizzans were relocated to Wels, then to Wimsbach, Upper Austria.

After the war, the Lipizzan stallions finally returned to Vienna in the autumn of 1955.

Legacy

Podhajsky is remembered most for saving the Lipizzans, preserving their history following the war, as well as for his dedication to the advancement of classical dressage, and his contributions to the Spanish Riding School.

He was awarded Order of Saint Sava.

See also
Classical dressage
Spanish Riding School
Lipizzan
Equestrian at the Summer Olympics
George S. Patton
Miracle of the White Stallions

Bibliography

References

External links 
Video from Austria, c. 1950s, of SRS, includes footage of Podhajsky
 Spanish Riding School
 Spanish Riding School of Vienna
 Official Lipizzaner Site
 Podhajsky profile with picture 
 
 Excerpt from My Horses, My Teachers, (Meine Lehrmeister die Pferde) on Lipizzan.com.
 dataOlympics profile
 Quotes by Podhajsky at Classical Dressage.com

1898 births
1973 deaths
Austrian male equestrians
Austrian dressage riders
Dressage trainers
Spanish Riding School
Olympic equestrians of Austria
Equestrians at the 1936 Summer Olympics
Equestrians at the 1948 Summer Olympics
Olympic bronze medalists for Austria
Austro-Hungarian people
Austrian people of Bosnia and Herzegovina descent
Austrian people of Czech descent
Olympic medalists in equestrian
Recipients of the Order of St. Sava
Sportspeople from Vienna
Writers on horsemanship
Medalists at the 1936 Summer Olympics
Commanders Crosses of the Order of Merit of the Federal Republic of Germany
Sportspeople from Mostar